Centura Public School  is a consolidated, K–12 school located in rural southern Howard County in central Nebraska, United States. It was founded in 1967 and serves the communities of Cairo, Dannebrog, Boelus, and the surrounding areas.  There are around 300 students enrolled in grades 7–12.

Centura participates in athletic competitions in class C-1 as the Centurions.

Most Centura classes are available through Angel eLearning. Students grades 9-12 receive MacBooks for the duration of their high school careers.

The school recently purchased two large projectors and screens, which were installed in the gym. Media class projects, local advertisers and sponsors, and club activities are shown during activities such as basketball or volleyball games.

Extracurricular activities

NSAA sanctioned

Sports

 Boys' basketball
 Girls' basketball
 Cross country
 Football
 Boys' golf
 Girls' golf
 Track
 Volleyball
 Wrestling

Clubs
 Band
 C-Club
 Chorus
 Drama
 FBLA
 FCCLA
 FFA
 HAL
 NHS
 One-Acts
 Speech
 Student Council

Non-NSAA
 Bowling
 Powerlifting
 Spirit Squad
 Trap shooting

References

Public high schools in Nebraska
Schools in Howard County, Nebraska
School districts established in 1967